The 2001 Premier League speedway season was the second division of speedway in the United Kingdom and governed by the Speedway Control Bureau (SCB), in conjunction with the British Speedway Promoters' Association (BSPA).

Season summary
The League consisted of 15 teams for the 2001 season with the addition of a new teams, the Trelawny Tigers. 

The League was run on a standard format with no play-offs and was won by Newcastle Diamonds.

Final table

Premier League Knockout Cup
The 2001 Premier League Knockout Cup was the 34th edition of the Knockout Cup for tier two teams. Hull Vikings were the winners of the competition.

First round

Quarter-finals

Semi-finals

Final
First leg

Second leg

Hull were declared Knockout Cup Champions, winning on aggregate 105–75.

Leading averages

Riders & final averages
Arena Essex

Leigh Lanham 8.84
Colin White 8.08
Troy Pratt 7.67
Shaun Tacey 7.20
Lee Dicken 5.47
Luke Clifton 4.00
Andy Galvin 3.40
Brent Collyer 3.24
Lee Herne 2.91
Barrie Evans 2.63

Berwick

Adrian Rymel 7.05
Scott Lamb 6.96..1P
Scott Robson 6.84
Michal Makovsky 6.73
David Meldrum 6.58
Wayne Carter 5.49
Bevan Compton .27
Josef Franc 5.25
Will Beveridge 4.76
David McAllan 2.88

Edinburgh

Peter Carr 10.01
Jan Andersen 8.03
Robert Eriksson 7.83
Daniel Andersson 7.01
Christian Henry 5.15
Blair Scott 5.08
Ben Shields 4.73
Derek Sneddon 3.77
Rory Schlein 1.29

Exeter

Michael Coles 9.19 
Mark Simmonds 8.05
Lawrence Hare 7.74
Seemond Stephens 7.62
Bobby Eldridge 5.28
Krister Marsh 5.02
Matt Cambridge 4.13
Jason Prynne 3.37
David Osborn 0.47

Glasgow

James Grieves 8.47 
Les Collins 8.07 
Emiliano Sanchez 7.25
Mark Courtney 6.53 
Stuart Swales 5.33
Henning Bager 4.92
Simon Cartwright 4.33
Aidan Collins 4.00
Derek Sneddon 3.66
Scott Courtney 1.71

Hull

Paul Thorp 9.03
Paul Bentley 8.49
David Walsh 8.06
Garry Stead 8.00
Ross Brady 6.98
Lee Dicken 6.58
Jamie Smith 5.27
Mike Smith 4.83
Justin Elkins 3.05

Isle of Wight

Ray Morton 9.42 
Danny Bird 8.79 
Adam Shields 8.61
Davey Watt 6.47
Sebastien Trésarrieu 6.46
Scott Swain 6.16
Glen Phillips 4.42

Newcastle

Bjarne Pedersen 10.16 
Andre Compton 8.13 
Jesper Olsen 8.11
Kevin Little 7.58 
Richard Juul 5.26
Rob Grant Jr 5.02
James Birkinshaw 4.25
Grant MacDonald 3.11

Newport

Anders Henriksson 8.95
Glenn Cunningham 7.55
Steve Masters 7.47
Emil Lindqvist 6.92
Scott Smith 6.32
Chris Neath 6.30
Krister Marsh 4.57
Carl Wilkinson 4.50
Tommy Palmer 4.48
Nick Simmons 3.48
Rob Finlow 1.88

Reading

Armando Castagna 9.05 
Charlie Gjedde 8.94
Phil Morris 8.42 
Dave Mullett 7.77
Paul Clews 7.39
Shane Colvin 5.38
Tommy Palmer 3.51
Chris Schramm 2.82
Brendon McKay 0.94

Sheffield

Sean Wilson 10.39
Simon Stead 9.98
Robbie Kessler 8.83
Scott Smith 7.18
Lee Complin 5.50
Adam Allott 4.86
Andrew Moore 4.81
Lee Redmond 4.64
Lee Hodgson 3.19

Stoke

Jan Staechmann 8.85
Paul Pickering 8.21
Tony Atkin 7.26
Mark Burrows 6.11
Jon Armstrong 4.79
Wayne Broadhurst 4.47
Dean Felton 3.91
Will Beveridge 3.41
Grant MacDonald 3.06
Neil Painter 1.37

Swindon

Paul Fry 8.27
Claus Kristensen 7.77
Oliver Allen 7.73
Alan Mogridge 7.63
Martin Dixon 7.11
Alun Rossiter 7.10
Mark Steel 6.20
Ritchie Hawkins 4.52

Trelawny

Chris Harris 7.82
Pavel Ondrašík 6.64
Brett Woodifield 6.59
Mark Courtney 6.21
Graeme Gordon 5.55
Kenny Olsson 5.00
Richard Wolff 5.00
Steffen Mell 4.20
Gary Phelps 4.00
Simon Phillips 3.55
Lee Herne 3.28

Workington

Carl Stonehewer 10.29 
Peter I Karlsson 9.03 
Neil Collins 7.67
Mick Powell 7.51
Rusty Harrison 7.25
Lee Smethills 4.39
James Mann 3.03
David McAllan 2.66
Craig Branney 1.55

See also
List of United Kingdom Speedway League Champions
Knockout Cup (speedway)

References

Speedway Premier League
England
Speedway